Sometimes You Have to Work on Christmas (Sometimes) is the second EP by Harvey Danger. It was released in December 2004 on the band's own label, Phonographic Records.  One of the songs is a demo from their next album, Little by Little..., two are different recordings of past songs, and the remaining two are rare songs, released only on special collections in the past.

The title song was originally recorded for Santa's Swingin' Sack, a 1998 CD compiled by Kevin and Bean, a disc jockey team for Los Angeles rock station KROQ.

Though as of mid-2005, this EP was out of print, the band re-released it for the 2005 holiday season.

Track listing
"Sometimes You Have to Work on Christmas (Sometimes)" – 5:12
"Plague of Locusts" – 3:18
"Wine, Women, and Song" (demo from Little By Little...) – 3:27
"Pike St./Park Slope" (demo from King James Version) – 4:41
"Jack the Lion" (live at The Crocodile Cafe, Seattle, 21/4/04; original version on Where Have All The Merrymakers Gone?'') – 5:59

Some copies purchased through the band's website were accompanied by a Christmas card signed by members of the band.

Personnel
 Aaron Huffman — Bass guitar
 Jeff J. Lin — Guitar, xylophone, organ, horn arrangement, piano, mixing
 Sean Nelson — Vocals, optigan
 Evan Sult — drums, sleigh bells
 Ben Gibbard — Backing vocals
 Anne Marie Ruljancich — Backing vocals
 Ken Stringfellow - Backing vocals
 Geoffrey Bergler - Trumpet
 Neal Bolter - French horn
 Charles Butler - Trumpet, piccolo trumpet
 David Ritt - Trombone
 John Goodmanson - Production, mixing, bass guitar
 Ed Brooks - Mastering

References

External links
Harvey Danger's official site

Harvey Danger albums
Albums produced by John Goodmanson
2004 EPs